George Smith (– November 14, 1850) was a Scottish-born merchant, shipbuilder and political figure in Nova Scotia. He represented Halifax County from 1819 to 1836, Pictou County from 1836 to 1838 and Pictou township from 1843 to 1845.

He was born in Banff. Smith was involved in the timber trade. He served as a member of the province's Legislative Council from 1838 to 1843. Smith was a probate judge for Pictou County from 1849 to 1850, a judge in the Supreme Court of Nova Scotia and custos rotulorum for the county.

References 
 A Directory of the Members of the Legislative Assembly of Nova Scotia, 1758-1958, Public Archives of Nova Scotia (1958)

Year of birth missing
1850 deaths
Nova Scotia pre-Confederation MLAs
Members of the Legislative Council of Nova Scotia
Colony of Nova Scotia judges